Dorcadion carinipenne is a species of beetle in the family Cerambycidae. It was described by Pic in 1900.

References

carinipenne
Beetles described in 1900